Pindra Road railway station is a small railway station in Varanasi district, Uttar Pradesh. Its code is PDRD. It serves Pindra area of Varanasi. The station consists of two platforms. The platforms are not well sheltered. It lacks many facilities including water and sanitation.

References 

Lucknow NR railway division
Railway stations in Varanasi district